Anna Holm (former Jørgensen, born 29 December 1987) is a Danish marathon runner. She placed 55th at the 2016 Olympics. Her father Henrik Jørgensen won the 1988 London Marathon. Her mother Mette Holm Hansen is also a marathon runner. She works as a marketing and communications specialist.

Personal bests
 800 meters: 2:12,96 (2005)
 1500 meters: 4:27,86 (2005)
 3000 meters: 9:13,92 (2015)
 5000 meters: 16:10,19 (2016) 
 10000 meters: 33:56,55 (2016)
 10 km: 33:31 (Odense, 2017, point to point run)
 Half Marathon: 1:12:56 (Copenhagen Half Marathon, 2017)
 Marathon: 2:33,02 (Frankfurt Marathon, 2017)

References

External links

 

1987 births
Living people
Danish female long-distance runners
Danish female marathon runners
Place of birth missing (living people)
Athletes (track and field) at the 2016 Summer Olympics
Olympic athletes of Denmark